Meiocarpidium is a genus of plants in the family Annonaceae. It is distributed in Cameroon, The Central African Republic, The Republic of the Congo, and Gabon.  Adolf Engler and Ludwig Diels, the German botanists who first formally described the genus, named it after the small number (Latinized form of Greek -, meio-) of carpels in the flowers.

Description
Meiocarpidium have solitary hermaphroditic flowers.  Their sepals have 3 small folds.  Their flowers have 6 petals arranged in two rows of three with the interior a little bigger than the exterior.  The flowers' receptacles are slightly convex. Their flowers have numerous stamen.  Their flowers have 3-5 carpels with ovules in two ventral rows.  Their seeds are brown, oval and are rounded on one side, but angular on the other.

Species
It is a monotypic genus consisting of:
 Meiocarpidium lepidotum (Oliv.) Engl. & Diels

References

Annonaceae
Annonaceae genera
Flora of Cameroon
Flora of the Central African Republic
Flora of the Republic of the Congo
Flora of Gabon
Monotypic magnoliid genera
Plants described in 1900
Taxa named by Adolf Engler
Taxa named by Ludwig Diels